7aum Arivu is a 2011 Indian Tamil-language science fiction martial arts film written and directed by A. R. Murugadoss, featuring Suriya, Johnny Trí Nguyễn and Shruti Haasan. In the film, a medical student enlists the help of a circus artist, who is a descendant of Bodhidharma, to revive the legend's skills and knowledge, while a Chinese man with hypnotic powers starts a government-planned biological war against India.

The film, produced by Udhayanidhi Stalin began production in May 2010 and was released on 25 October 2011 in Chennai and a day later, on Diwali, worldwide. The visual effects for the film were done by US based Legacy Effects, making this their second Indian film after Enthiran. It was also dubbed into Telugu as 7th Sense which released simultaneously along with the Tamil original. The film was also dubbed in Hindi as Chennai v/s China in 2014 as well as in Malayalam with the original title. The film was also one out of several films selected by the South Indian Film Chamber of Commerce for being the Indian submission for Oscar under the Academy Award for Best Foreign Language Film.

Plot
Bodhidharma, a master of martial arts and medical remedies, is the son of a great Indian king of the Pallava dynasty. He is sent to China by his guru, who requests him to stop the spread of an epidemic existing there from spreading to India. Initially, the Chinese treat him as an inferior. However, when he cures a little girl infected by the disease and defeats people who ill-treated the villagers, the Chinese then began to respect and worship him. He begins to teach them how to cure many diseases, the skills of hypnotism, and the physical training of the Shaolin monks that led to the creation of Shaolinquan. After several years, when he expresses his desire to return to India, the villagers plot to poison him and bury him near the temple, believing that their village would be free of diseases if he is buried there. Bodhidharma agrees to die and subsequently becomes a fundamental figure in Chinese history, affectionately being dubbed as "Damo".

In modern-day China, Dong Lee is given the task of starting a government-planned biological war against India, known as Operation Red. He arrives in Chennai and commences by injecting a virus into a pariah dog, being the same as the one from Bodhidharma's period. Meanwhile, Subha Srinivasan, a genetics student, discovers that Bodhidharma can be brought back to life if his sample of DNA is matched with another sample of DNA. Coincidentally, she finds a matching sample in Aravind, a descendant of Bodhidharma who is working as a circus artist. Dong Lee finds out about Subha's mission to revive Bodhidharma and plans to kill her first so that the disease cannot be stopped.

Subha approaches Aravind but begins to fall in love and spend time with him, forgetting about her mission. One day, Aravind's family sees Subha and clearly remembers that she visited them a year before to find Aravind and know all about him for the Bodhidharma research. Saving herself, she lies by saying that she does not know them. Later that night, Aravind's uncle explains all what happened one year before when they met Subha. Aravind goes and meets Subha and is enraged upon realising the truth. However, the next day, he reconciles with Subha in a love failure mood and agrees to contribute to the research and hence save the country. The research begins to resurrect Bodhidharma and to end Operation Red. Dong Lee continues to wreak havoc on the city.

Subha goes to her genetics department and announces that Operation Red can be stopped if they read and make use of the cures in a book written by Bodhidharma. However, the department laughs and refuses to believe her, claiming that an ancient book is of no use in modern times, much to her dismay. After some time, Subha and Aravind learn that Subha's professor from the genetics department is assisting Dong Lee in Operation Red. They sneak into the professor's apartment and learn about the operation. The next day, the professor is caught red-handed by Aravind, Subha, and her friends Ashwin, Imran, Malathi and Nisha but surrenders and explains that he received a huge sum of money from the China government if he carried out Operation Red. After the professor gives the gang more details about Operation Red and how to stop it, they leave. However, Dong Lee eventually arrives, and the professor once again teams up with him to save his own life.

Subha, Aravind, and their gang barely escape fromnan attempt on their lives by Dong Lee. They finally locate a research centre where they can activate Bodhidharma's DNA in Aravind and decide to hide there for a few days. They all deactivate their phones so that nobody can trace them. However, Dong Lee somehow traces Aravind, Subha and rear of her friends by using Malathi and Imran. However, he kills both of them afterwards. Dong Lee then locates the place of the research centre. Subha and her friends in the research centre escape in a van, but Dong Lee chases them, and the van collapses. An unconscious Aravind eventually absorbs Bodhidharma's powers, using them to prevail and kill Dong Lee in battle. Aravind uses an ancient medicine to cure the disease, gets married and finally tells the press about the importance of Indian history.

Cast

 Suriya as Bodhidharma and Aravind
 Johnny Trí Nguyễn as Dong Lee
 Shruti Haasan as Subalakshmi Srinivasan 
 Abhinaya as Bodhidharma's wife
 Guinness Pakru as Aravind's friend
 Ashwin Kakumanu as Ashwin
 Saahil Chitkara as Imran Saahil
 Dhanya Balakrishna as Malathi
 Misha Ghoshal as Nisha
 Urmila Unni as a Tamil queen of the Pallava dynasty
 Avinash as a Tamil king
 Ilavarasu as Aravind's uncle
 Sujatha Sivakumar as Aravind's aunt
 Ramanathan as Rangarajan
 Azhagam Perumal in a guest appearance as a museum curator
 Anand Shankar in a guest appearance

Production

Casting
Initial reports suggested that Suriya would play three characters; a circus artist, a scientist and a Buddhist monk, for a portion set in China in the 5–6th century. However, it was clarified that the scientist's role would be performed by the female lead, Shruti Haasan, while Suriya would play a modern-day circus artist as well as Bodhidharma, a Buddhist monk who lived during the 5th century. Vietnamese actor and martial artist Johnny Tri Nguyen was signed to play the antagonist, while Kannada actor Avinash who worked with P. Vasu earlier for Chandramukhi (2005) and Abhinaya of Naadodigal fame were selected to play minor supporting roles in the film.

Influences
Sources claimed that the film drew inspirations from Christopher Nolan's Inception. However, the director dismissed the news, reasoning that he had begun shooting much before the release of Inception. Murugadoss further denied reports that the film was a remake of the Bollywood flick Chandni Chowk to China, as both were supposed to be set in China, and that the film's concept was similar to that of the Hollywood film Perfume, confirming the script as the original. After completing the film, he emphasised that he had not been inspired by or remade any film, stating that Hollywood filmmakers can "feel free to remake 7aum Arivu".

Filming
The first schedule of the film was completed in China and those fifteen minutes of the edited film reportedly cost 15 crore. Later, some shots were canned in Trichy and later at Ampa Skywalk, followed by the song Oh Ringa Ringa in Besant Nagar, for which 1000 junior artists were allotted, and a stunt sequence in Perambur. In the process, Suriya had an ankle injury due to which the shot was postponed for three days. Suriya underwent physical training for a kung fu sequence within 16 days, following cinematographer Ravi K. Chandran's request. Shabina Khan designed the costumes for Suriya and Shruti, staying with the team throughout the filming process in Bangkok and Hong Kong. The song "Mun Andhi" was shot in Thailand. Though initial reports stated that the film would feature a time machine, they were later dismissed.

The visual effects of the film were done by Legacy Effects at an approximate cost of 10 crore, who had made an impact in Hollywood for their work in the Terminator series, the Jurassic Park series, Aliens, the Predator series, Iron Man, Edward Scissorhands, and Avatar.

Music

The soundtrack, composed by Harris Jayaraj, consists of six songs including a Chinese track, sung by Chinese singer Wang Hao. It marks the second collaboration of Jayaraj and Murugadoss after the success of Ghajini. Lyrics were penned by Madhan Karky. The audio rights of the album were secured by Sony Music reportedly for a whopping amount. The composition of the soundtrack took place in Singapore. The audio was released on 22 September 2011 in Chennai Trade Centre in a grand manner. The event was hosted by Jai and Anjali, lead pair of Murugadoss' production Engeyum Eppodhum, while Bollywood actress Isha Sharvani, Lakshmi Rai and several international artists performed on stage, which were choreographed by Shobi. Actors Dhanush, Karthi, Jiiva, Jayam Ravi, Vishal and Ram Charan attended the function, with Dhanush releasing the trailer. Though initial reports said that Shahrukh Khan would appear in the launch, it was later dismissed.

Critical response
P. G. Devi from Behindwoods gave 3.5/5 and commented: "The album promises a couple of big chart-busting hits like the peppy 'Ringa Ringa', the melodious 'Mun Andhi' and the pathos-ridden 'Yamma Yamma'. Though there is a déjà vu feel all around the album, its a sure shot commercial success". Indiaglitz stated that "the unique stamp of Harris can be felt throughout the disc, and that makes songs [...] a treat to senses", recommending it for "those who love and appreciate good music". Pavithra Srinivasan from Rediff provided 2.5/5, mentioning that "it looks like Harris Jeyaraj has run out of steam. While Yemma Yemma and The Rise of Damo are appealing, the rest sound like he remixed some of his own older numbers, or chose to be inspired by other classics [...] 7aum Arivu's music does have its moments, but these are few and far between." Prakash Upadhyaya from Oneindia said that the album had "variety of songs. The soundtracks will have larger appeal when it is watched".

Release
Bharath Creations bought the rights for the film in US and Canada. The film's worldwide theatrical rights were sold for 60 crore. The satellite rights of the film were sold to Sun TV. The film was given a U certificate by the Censor Board, but did not get the 30 percent entertainment tax waiver until more than 100 days after release. The film was scheduled for a Diwali release on 26 October 2011; with producer Udhayanidhi Stalin's intervention, it was brought forward by one day, opening ahead of the other films. The distribution rights in Kerala were acquired for 2.4 crore, releasing in more than 100 screens. In Chennai, the film released in 51 screens. The film was the largest release in Suriya's career, opening with 1000 prints worldwide, with 400 prints in Tamil Nadu alone. The Telugu dubbed version, 7th Sense had the second largest release in Andhra Pradesh for a dubbed film by opening up in 400 screens across the state. A special screening was shown to actor Kamal Haasan. In Malaysia, the film was released in record 53 screens. In the US, the film was released in both Tamil and Telugu in 50 screens.

Critical reception
Indiaglitz claimed that Murugadoss had made a "bold attempt" and "succeeded in it with the help of Suriya and Udhayanidhi Stalin", lauding him for "conveying a bitter truth [...] in a sugar coating", and going on to claim it to be a "winner in all his invasions". Behindwoods described it as "technical finesse catering to commercial compulsions", giving the film 3 out of 5. Rediff gave it 3 out of 5, noting that it was "worth a watch" and had "several things working for it". Sify called the film "average", writing that "the effort of Murugadoss to make a special kind of film is laudable but seems to lack the imagination required to pull off what he set out to achieve". Nowrunning.com rated it 3/5 stating that "a hopeful beginning makes this routine fare an absolute disappointment. This is not a bad film. You just expect better from a director like Murugadoss".

Box office
7aum Arivu had a strong opening on 25 October, a day prior to Diwali. The film earned 40.25 crore in its six-day opening weekend from all over the world. In Chennai alone, the film grossed 9 crore in its lifetime. Indian film trades considered the film a commercial success, despite a high budget and distribution price. 7aum Arivu is thought to have grossed an estimated 90 crore–100 crore worldwide in its lifetime.

Controversies

Some criticism toward the film involved historical inaccuracies pertaining to the character Bodhidharma. According to experts, he had travelled from India to China with the main intention of propagating Buddhism and his portrayal as a man with "medicinal knowledge" and his expertise at "martial arts" were not well received by the viewers who claimed that the film gives too much emphasis on his identity as a Tamilian rather than highlighting the other facts. The film was compared by film historian S. Theodore Baskaran with other Tamil films about history and folklore which had been historically inaccurate like Veerapandiya Kattabomman and Parthiban Kanavu. Babu T. Raghu, a Buddhist teacher, noted in a press conference that the monk was 150 years old when he reached China, while in the film they had depicted him in his 20s. He expressed his desire to debate with the film-makers. Also, He said that he had material evidence to prove it, while sparking off a hunger strike across the country on Bodhidharma's followers. Other sources also reported a similar issue.

Later reports claimed that the film was very similar to the game Assassin's Creed. Some were of the opinion that the film and the game were based on the same concept, despite being different in other aspects. The film Velayudham, which had released alongside 7aum Arivu was also compared with the game.

The film was sent for CBFC certification with a dummy background score, and the official re-recording happened thereafter, triggering protests demanding re-certification.

References

External links
 

2011 films
2011 science fiction action films
Martial arts science fiction films
Indian chase films
Indian martial arts films
Indian science fiction action films
Films shot in China
Films shot in Thailand
Films shot in Tiruchirappalli
Films directed by AR Murugadoss
2010s Tamil-language films
Films about genetic engineering
Films shot in Hong Kong
Films set in ancient China
Films set in ancient India
Films scored by Harris Jayaraj
Films set in Beijing
Kalarippayattu films
2011 martial arts films
Indian science fiction films